Alapati Noga (born September 16, 1965) is a former American football defensive lineman who played seven seasons in the National Football League.

Noga was an Outland Trophy finalist, and an AP first-team All-American at the University of Hawaii at Manoa.  He was drafted by the Minnesota Vikings with the 71st pick in the third round in the 1988 NFL Draft.  In the December 27, 1999, issue of Sports Illustrated, he was listed as number 46 on their "50 Greatest Hawaii Sports Figures" list.

Noga is married to Theresa Sagapolutele. Noga's brothers, Pete and Niko, both played at the University of Hawai'i and Niko played later in the NFL.

References

1965 births
Living people
American sportspeople of Samoan descent
American football defensive linemen
Hawaii Rainbow Warriors football players
Minnesota Vikings players
Washington Redskins players
Players of American football from American Samoa
San Jose SaberCats players
Portland Forest Dragons players